Ebenezer Dorkutso Dugbatey  (born 31 July 1973) is a Ghanaian former professional football defender who played for clubs in Africa and Europe.

Club career
Dugbatey was born in Accra. He played for FC Lorient in the French Ligue 1 and Ligue 2. He had a brief spell with Samsunspor in the Turkish Süper Lig.

International career
Dugbatey made seven appearances for the full Ghana national team, including two matches at the 2000 African Cup of Nations finals, where he was the first player to be sent off in the tournament. He also made two appearances in qualifying matches for the 2002 FIFA World Cup.

References

External links
 
 Interview with Eben Dugbatey 

Living people
1973 births
Association football defenders
Ghanaian footballers
Ghana international footballers
2000 African Cup of Nations players
Ghanaian expatriate footballers
Ligue 1 players
Ligue 2 players
Belgian Pro League players
Accra Hearts of Oak S.C. players
Samsunspor footballers
FC Solothurn players
FC Lorient players
R.A.A. Louviéroise players
Cambridge United F.C. players
Expatriate footballers in Belgium
Ghanaian expatriate sportspeople in France
Expatriate footballers in Turkey
Ghanaian expatriate sportspeople in Italy
Expatriate footballers in Switzerland
Ghanaian expatriate sportspeople in Switzerland
Expatriate footballers in Italy
Ghanaian expatriate sportspeople in Belgium
Expatriate footballers in France
Expatriate footballers in England
Ghanaian expatriate sportspeople in Turkey